"Sippin' on Some Syrup", sometimes known as "Sippin' on Some Sizzurp", is the second single from Three 6 Mafia's fourth studio album When the Smoke Clears: Sixty 6, Sixty 1. It features UGK and Project Pat. The song samples the synthesizer intro and keyboard instrumental from Marvin Gaye's 1978 song "Is That Enough" from his album Here, My Dear. The song peaked at #30 on the Hot R&B/Hip-Hop Songs chart.

Music video
A video directed by Jeff Byrd was made for the song, with  airtime on MTV and BET. It features an Insane Clown Posse "Amazing Jeckel Brothers" shirt at 1:14, a reference to Three 6 Mafia's longstanding friendship with Psychopathic Records.

The video version censors all references to purple drank, including the chorus, which is rendered as "sippin' on some s*****p".

Remix
The main remix, "Sippin' on Some Syrup (Remix)" a.k.a. "Purple Punch" Chevy 04 Purple Caddy, features Dipset rappers Cam'ron, Jim Jones, & Juelz Santana. DJ Paul, Juicy J, and Bun B also return with new verses (Pimp C could not return due to his incarceration) and Project Pat's chorus from the original was included. A video of the remix was made, although Cam'ron's verse is removed.

Chart performance

References

External links
 Sippin' on Some Syrup original video

2000 singles
Three 6 Mafia songs
UGK songs
Gangsta rap songs
Dirty rap songs
Songs about drugs
2000 songs
Songs written by Juicy J
Songs written by DJ Paul
Posse cuts